The Double is a 1934 German crime comedy film directed by E. W. Emo and starring Georg Alexander, Camilla Horn, and Gerda Maurus. It was the last Edgar Wallace adaptation made in Germany before the Second World War. The film's sets were designed by the art director Wilhelm Depenau and Erich Zander. It was shot at the Halensee Studios in Berlin.

Plot 
Mr Miller, who lives in Australia, believes his wealth manager and distant relative, Harry Salsbury, was in London. He decides to travel to Europe with his niece Jenny to confront Harry. Jenny, who just turned 18, already fell in love with the image of her cousin Harry in Australia. With a trick, she manages in Naples to send her uncle to Paris and secretly fly to London herself. There, she quickly moves in with Harry and turns his life upside down. Although he can prove that Jenny's uncle's assets are well invested in stocks and securities. But under Jenny's supervision, he has to put an end to his supposedly bad lifestyle. Jenny forces him to exercise and denies him his favorite foods.

Harry is friends with the married painter Germaine de Roche. Because her rabid husband gets suspicious, he has her followed by the detective Superbus. To avoid this, Germaine persuades Harry to go to Ostend together. Harry, who under no circumstances wants to tell Jenny anything about this trip, pretends to be spending a few days in Scotland. His servant is supposed to send letters to Jenny from there. After Harry's departure, the detective Superbus appears at Jenny's. He reports on the mysterious doppelganger who commits his crimes in the guise of respected London businessmen. His accomplice has the task of luring the victims out of London in order to be able to work there undisturbed. When Jenny drives to the train station to warn Harry, he has already left.

Little does Jenny know that Harry has meanwhile returned to his villa because he feared a scandal. There, to his surprise, Harry meets Germaine, who pretends to have fled from her angry husband. Jenny, who has also returned in the meantime, thinks Harry and Germaine are the crooks and locks them up without further ado. Strange things are happening in the mansion at night. After a burglary and a shootout, the true doppelganger is revealed. The misunderstandings between Mr. Miller, Jenny and Harry are resolved. And in the end, Jenny and Harry are a couple.

Cast

References

Bibliography

External links 
 

1934 films
Films of Nazi Germany
1930s German-language films
Films directed by E. W. Emo
1930s crime comedy films
German crime comedy films
Films set in London
Films shot at Halensee Studios
German black-and-white films
1934 comedy films
1930s German films